Zhang Baoshun (born February 1950) is a retired politician of the People's Republic of China, and the former Communist Party Secretary of east China's Anhui province.

Early life
Zhang was born in Qinhuangdao, Hebei, on February 27, 1950.

Career
Zhang started working in November 1968, and joined the Chinese Communist Party in April 1971. He served in various posts in Qinhuangdao harbor administration bureau before entering Communist Youth League central committee in December 1978. From December 1982 to November 1985, Zhang was an alternate secretary of CYL central secretariat and director of CYL department of workers and peasants youth. He was elevated to a secretary of CYL central secretariat in November 1985, and the post was confirmed as the rank of vice minister in November 1991. From August 1982 to June 1987, he took correspondence courses at Renmin University of China and obtained a degree in Marxism-Leninism theory. From November 1991, he became the chairman of Chinese Youth Association and a secretary of CYL central secretariat. From December 1989 to December 1991, he pursued an on-job master's degree in national economic planning and management in school of economic management of Jilin University. In April 1993, Zhang became the vice president of Xinhua News Agency and a Party committee member there. In March 1998, Zhang was elevated to vice president and vice Party chief of Xinhua Agency. From September 2001 to January 2004, he was the vice secretary of CCP Shanxi committee. From January 2004, he served as vice governor, acting governor and later governor of Shanxi. Since July 2005, he has served as secretary of CCP Shanxi committee, and also served as chairman of Shanxi provincial People's Congress since January 2006.

Zhang was a member of 14th Central Commission for Discipline Inspection. He was an alternate member of 16th Central Committee of the CCP, and a full member of the 17th and 18th Central Committees. On October 30, 2011, he was officially elected as secretary of east China's Anhui Provincial Committee of the Chinese Communist Party at the first plenary session of the 9th CCP Anhui Provincial Committee.

Zhang retired as party chief of Anhui in June 2015 after reaching the age of 65, which is typically the retirement age of provincial-level officials.

References
 "Zhang Baoushun", Who's Who in China's Leadership, China Internet Information Center.
 "Zhang Baoshun 张宝顺", biography at China Vitae.
 "Zhang Baoshun elected Party chief of east China's Anhui Province", People's Daily Online.

1950 births
Living people
Politicians from Qinhuangdao
People's Republic of China politicians from Hebei
Tuanpai
Jilin University alumni
Chinese Communist Party politicians from Hebei
Governors of Shanxi
Political office-holders in Anhui
Xinhua News Agency people